Parisā is a Persian feminine given name.

History 
The ancient Persian name "Parysatis" is related to this name. Two notable women with the name "Parysatis" are: Parysatis, who was the wife of Darius II, (Dārayavahuš), king of the Persian Empire and Parysatis II, the youngest daughter of Artaxerxes III of Persia, who was the wife of Alexander the Great.

"Pari" can be used as a diminutive of Parisa, however Pari is used as a name of its own right as well. Pari is sometimes incorrectly translated to angel; Fereshteh is a feminine given name that means angel. The Pari (or Peri) in Persian mythology are described to be a race of beautiful and benevolent supernatural fairy beings, earlier regarded as malevolent.

People with the given name Parisa 
Notable people with the name Parisa include:

Parisa (born 1950), Iranian vocalist and musician
Parisa Bakhtavar (born 1972), Iranian film and television director
Parisa Fakhri (born 1975), Iranian actress
Parisa Fitz-Henley (born 1977), Jamaican-American actress
Parisa Damandan (born 1967), Iranian art historian
Parisa Liljestrand (born 1983), Swedish politician for the Moderate Party
Parisa Mehrkhodavandi, a Canadian chemist.
Parisa Tabriz (born 1983), Iranian-American computer security expert who works for Google as a Director of Engineering

See also 

 Parisa, Leah’s pet purple fox in the American animated television series Shimmer and Shine

References

Persian feminine given names